Anura may refer to:

Biology
 Anura (frog), the order for frogs
 Anura (plant), a genus of flowering plants in the daisy family

People
Anura is a common given name in Sri Lanka
 Anura Bandaranaike (1949–2008), Sri Lankan politician
 Anura Kumara Dissanayaka (born 1968), Sri Lankan politician
 Anura Horatious, Sri Lankan novelist
 Anura C. Perera (born 1947), Sri Lankan-American writer and astronomer
 Anura Ranasinghe (1956–1998), Sri Lankan cricketer
 Anura Rohana, Sri Lankan golfer
 Anura Tennekoon (born 1946), Sri Lankan cricketer
 Anura Wegodapola (born 1981), cricketer for Sri Lanka Navy
 Anura Priyadharshana Yapa (born 1959), Sri Lankan politician

Place
 Anura, Varanasi, a village in Uttar Pradesh, India

See also
 Aruna (disambiguation)

Taxonomy disambiguation pages
Sinhalese masculine given names